Keith Knox (born 20 June 1967), is a Scottish  former professional boxer who competed from 1994 to 2001. He held the British and Commonwealth flyweight titles in 1999, and once challenged for the IBO light flyweight title in 2001.

Amateur career 
Knox won the 1992 Amateur Boxing Association British flyweight title, when boxing out of the Bonnybrigg ABC.

Professional career 
Knox made his professional debut on 4 March 1994 with a fourth-round knockout win over Ian Bailie.

On 20 November 1995, Knox for Louis Veitch for the vacant BBBofC Scottish Area flyweight title, winning via sixth round technical knockout (TKO).

His next fight was on 21 March 1996, against Mickey Cantwell (10-3-1) for the vacant British flyweight title. Knox suffered his first career defeat, losing by a twelve round points decision.

On 13 September 1996, Knox challenged undefeated Danish fighter Jesper Jensen (17-0) for the EBU European flyweight title, losing by unanimous decision. Two judges scored the bout 117-112, while the third scored it 117-113.

Knox again challenged for the vacant British flyweight title on 27 January 1997, against undefeated Ady Lewis (11-0), losing again by points decision.

His next title attempt came on 1 June 1998, against Zimbabwean Alfonso Zvenyika Lambarda (10-6), losing by eighth-round TKO.

On 22 May 1999, Knox challenged undefeated British and Commonwealth flyweight champion Damaen Kelly (9-0) at the Maysfield Leisure Centre in Belfast, Northern Ireland. The fight was stopped after the end of round six due to Kelly suffering cuts above both eyes, crowning Knox the British and Commonwealth flyweight champion via sixth round TKO.

Knox defended his titles against Nottingham fighter Jason Booth (15-1) on 16 November 1999. Knox lost the fight, and his titles, when the referee waved off the fight in the tenth round after Booth landed a clean right uppercut.

On 20 March 2001, Knox fought Colombian IBO light flyweight champion Jose Garcia Bernal (24-4-1) at the Bellahouston Leisure Centre In Glasgow, Scotland. Knox lost by split decision (115-114, 113-117, 113-116) in what would be the final fight of his professional career.

Professional boxing record

References

External links

Image - Keith Knox

1967 births
Bantamweight boxers
Flyweight boxers
Light-flyweight boxers
Scottish male boxers
Boxers from Edinburgh
Super-flyweight boxers
Living people
Sportspeople from Windsor, Berkshire